Barrow Hill Plantation was a large forced-labor farm of  located in central Leon County, Florida, United States. It was established by John S. Winthrop, who by 1860 enslaved 71 people to work his land, which was primarily dedicated to growing cotton as a cash crop.

Location
Barrow Hill Plantation had two tracts of land. The first tract would cover what is now western sections of E. Tennessee St, eastern parts of Miccosukee Road, and Leon High School. The second tract to the east bordered Joseph John Williams' La Grange Plantation on the west and would cover what is now a part of Chaires Cross, a part of Buck Lake Road, and Interstate 10.

Plantation specifics
The Leon County Florida 1860 Agricultural Census shows that Barrow Hill Plantation had the following:
 Improved Land: 
 Unimproved Land: 
 Cash value of plantation: $10,000
 Cash value of farm implements/machinery: $500
 Cash value of farm animals: $3000
 Number of enslaved persons: 71
 Bushels of corn: 2,200
 Bales of cotton: 204

Agents on behalf of John Winthrop:
R.S.D. Hays
T.W. Lawrence

The owner
John S. Winthrop was a native of New Bern, North Carolina. Information shows that in 1860, Winthrop was still a legal minor. Due to the SS Home wreck of 1837, Winthrop was due to receive a large property inheritance originally going to Henrietta Smith, his great-grandmother and mother of the deceased Mrs. Hardy Croom of Goodwood Plantation. John Winthrop, like other planters, would feel the effects of the American Civil War, losing plantation land and the legal right to enslave people. Winthrop eventually built a fine home in Tallahassee in 1890.

John Winthrop's home 
The below photos(?) are of John S. Winthrop's home at 610 N. Monroe Street in Tallahassee. The home was built in 1890 by John and his wife, Lilia Chouteau Winthrop. 

It later went to John's son Francis B. Winthrop, who served a term as Mayor of Tallahassee, and wife Gertude Chittenden Withrop who lived there from 1910-1925. Guy Winthrop and wife Ada Belle Winthrop inhabited after.

References
Rootsweb Plantations
Largest Slaveholders from 1860 Slave Census Sschedules
Paisley, Clifton. From Cotton To Quail, University of Florida Press, c1968.

Plantations in Leon County, Florida
Cotton plantations in Florida